Jackie Plenderleith (born 6 October 1937 in Bellshill) is a Scottish former footballer, who played for Hibernian, Manchester City and Queen of the South amongst others. Plenderleith was capped once by the Scotland national football team.

References

Sources

External links

1937 births
Living people
Footballers from Bellshill
Scottish footballers
Scotland international footballers
Scottish expatriate footballers
Expatriate soccer players in South Africa
Scottish Football League players
English Football League players
Armadale Thistle F.C. players
Hibernian F.C. players
Manchester City F.C. players
Queen of the South F.C. players
Cape Town City F.C. (NFL) players
Scottish expatriate sportspeople in South Africa
Scotland under-23 international footballers
Association football central defenders
National Football League (South Africa) players